Volodymyr Sysenko (born 19 April 1962 in Shahrinav) is a former Ukrainian footballer and manager from Tajikistan.

Native of a Tajikstani village near Dushanbe, Sysenko made his professional debut at the end of the 1980 Soviet First League for FC Pamir Dushanbe coming as a substitute in home game against FC Fakel Voronezh. A little more play time he was given in 1982 and 1983, but eventually was transferred out to FC Dinamo Samarqand for couple of seasons that was playing a tier below. In 1986-1989 Sysenko was a regular first squad player for his hometown Pamir and made his debut in the 1989 Soviet Top League.

Around the time of dissolution of the Soviet Union in 1990-1994, Sysenko played for second tier teams in Russian Federation, Uzbekistan and Ukraine. In 1995 he returned playing for Kuban and then moved to Nakhodka. After 1995 he played for lower tier or amateur teams in Russian Federation, Ukraine, and Central Asia before retiring in 2000.

In 2011 he became one of the co-founders of SC Poltava which he also manages.

References

External links 
 
 

1962 births
Living people
Ukrainian footballers
CSKA Pamir Dushanbe players
FC Kuban Krasnodar players
FC Okean Nakhodka players
FC Vorskla Poltava players
FC Rubin Kazan players
FC Elektron Romny players
FC Lokomotyv Znamianka players
FC Zhetysu players
Ukrainian First League players
Ukrainian football managers
Association football defenders